Monito Island (English: Little Mona) is an uninhabited island about  northwest of the much larger Mona Island. Monito is the masculine diminutive form of Mona in Spanish, which also translates to little monkey in Spanish. It is one of three islands in the Mona Passage, and part of the Isla de Mona e Islote Monito barrio, a subdivision of the municipality of Mayagüez, Puerto Rico. 

Description 

The island is uninhabited. The high altitude of the island's shoreline makes it inaccessible by sea. The US coast guard has rescued migrants off Monito Island. The Monito gecko is found only on Monito Island.

Gallery

See also 

 Timeline of Mayagüez, Puerto Rico

References

External links 
 
  Monito Island summary from the University of Puerto Rico-Mayagüez Department of Biology Herbarium

Uninhabited islands of Puerto Rico
Mayagüez, Puerto Rico
National Natural Landmarks in Puerto Rico